Glenea quadrinotata is a species of beetle in the family Cerambycidae. It was described by Félix Édouard Guérin-Méneville in 1843. It is known from Myanmar, Malaysia, Laos, India, and Thailand.

References

quadrinotata
Beetles described in 1843